is a 2007 Japanese film directed by Masayuki Suo, starring Ryo Kase, Asaka Seto and Kōji Yakusho.

Plot
Based on a true story, the film is the story of a young man charged with groping on a train. Following the events depicted in the film, which end in a conviction and his decision to appeal, in real life his appeal was rejected by supreme court and his sentence to 18 months of prison has been confirmed.

Cast
 Ryo Kase
 Asaka Seto
 Kōji Yakusho
 Masako Motai
 Koji Yamamoto
 Ranran Suzuki
 Fumiyo Kohinata
 Miyu Yagyu
 Toshinori Omi

Release
The film premiered at the American Film Market in November 2006 in the United States and distributed by Toho in Japan on January 20, 2007. It was later shown in New York City on January 11, 2007.

It was Japan's submission to the 80th Academy Awards for the Academy Award for Best Foreign Language Film, but was not accepted as a nominee. It was chosen as the Best Film at the 2008 Yokohama Film Festival.

See also

Cinema of Japan
List of Japanese submissions for the Academy Award for Best Foreign Language Film

References

Footnotes

Sources

External links
 

Films directed by Masayuki Suo
2000s Japanese-language films
Japanese crime drama films
2007 films
2000s legal films
Japanese courtroom films
Films about miscarriage of justice
Rail transport films
Best Film Kinema Junpo Award winners
Toho films
2000s Japanese films